German submarine U-340 was a Type VIIC U-boat of Nazi Germany's Kriegsmarine during World War II.

The submarine was laid down on 1 October 1941 at the Nordseewerke yard at Emden, launched on 20 August 1942, and commissioned on 16 October 1942 under the command of Oberleutnant zur See Hans-Joachim Klaus. U-340 served with the 8th U-boat Flotilla, for training and then with the 6th U-boat Flotilla for operational service from 1 May to 2 November 1943.

Design
German Type VIIC submarines were preceded by the shorter Type VIIB submarines. U-340 had a displacement of  when at the surface and  while submerged. She had two shafts and two  propellers.

U-340 was fitted with five  torpedo tubes (four fitted at the bow and one at the stern), fourteen torpedoes, one  SK C/35 naval gun, 220 rounds, and two twin  C/30 anti-aircraft guns. The boat had a complement of between forty-four and sixty.

Service history

First patrol
U-340 sailed from Kiel on 29 April 1943, and out into the Atlantic to the waters south-east of Cape Farewell, Greenland, before returning to Bordeaux on 31 May, after 33 days at sea with no successes.

Second patrol
U-340s next patrol took her from Bordeaux on 6 July 1943, south to the coast of West Africa. On 25 August she rescued five Luftwaffe airmen off the coast of Spain, and was attacked by an aircraft shortly afterwards, suffering some damage; several men were wounded. She returned to Saint-Nazaire on 2 September.

Third patrol
U-340s third and final patrol began on 17 October 1943, sailing from Saint-Nazaire south to the Strait of Gibraltar. One of U-340s crew was killed and 48 survived the attack.

See also
 Mediterranean U-boat Campaign (World War II)

References

Bibliography

External links
 

German Type VIIC submarines
U-boats commissioned in 1942
U-boats sunk in 1943
U-boats sunk by depth charges
U-boats sunk by British warships
World War II submarines of Germany
Maritime incidents in November 1943
World War II shipwrecks in the Mediterranean Sea
1942 ships
Ships built in Emden